Janczyce  is a village in the administrative district of Gmina Baćkowice, within Opatów County, Świętokrzyskie Voivodeship, in south-central Poland.

Population 
The village has a population of 180.

References

Janczyce